The SV Wacker Burghausen II is a defunct German association football club from Burghausen, Bavaria. It was the reserve team of SV Wacker Burghausen.

The team's greatest successes came in 2005 and 2012 when it qualified on both occasions for the Bayernliga, the fifth tier of the German football league system, where it played until 2014 when the club decided to withdraw the team from competition at the end of the season.

History
The team, for most part of its history, was just the reserve side of an amateur team and its rise began when the senior side began to rise through the ranks of Bavarian football. Wacker's first team earned promotion to the Bayernliga for the first time in 1993, followed by promotion to the Regionalliga. With the senior team going as far as the 2. Bundesliga from 2002 to 2007 the reserve team began to rise, too, winning promotion to the Bezirksliga Oberbayern-Ost in 1998.

Wacker II stayed for only one season in the Bezirksliga, finishing second in 1998–99 and earning promotion to the Bezirksoberliga Oberbayern. This league, too, became only a transitional stage for the side, achieving another runners-up finish and promotion in 2000–01. The team now entered the Landesliga Bayern-Süd, where it spent the next four seasons, improving every year and eventually winning the league in 2004–05. The seniors team's rise to professional football in 2002 meant for the reserve side a name change to SV Wacker Burghausen Amateure, but this was reverted in 2005 when all reserve sides of Bundesliga and 2. Bundesliga teams moved to a Roman numeral system for identification.

The team spent two seasons in the Bayernliga, but was not able to perform as well there as in its previous years, being relegated again in 2006–07, the same year the senior team was relegated from the 2. Bundesliga. Wacker II had three reasonable seasons in the Landesliga after that but came only 15th in 2010–11 and very close to relegation. The following year the team improved dramatically, taking out the last league title in the Landesliga Süd before it was disbanded. On paper this would have qualified the team to take part in the promotion round to the new Regionalliga Bayern but, as the reserve team of a 3. Liga side, it was not allowed to enter Regionalliga football and therefore moved up into the new southern division of the Bayernliga instead.

The side performed well at this level, too, finishing second but once more not being able to take part in the promotion round to the Regionalliga because of the senior teams 3. Liga status.

At the end of the 2013–14 season, in which the team finished 15th in the Bayernliga, the club announced it would withdraw its reserve side from competition altogether.

Honours
The club's honours:
 Bayernliga-Süd (V)
 Runners-up: 2013
 Landesliga Bayern-Süd (V) 
 Champions: 2005, 2012
 Bezirksoberliga Oberbayern (VI)
 Runners-up: 2001
 Bezirksliga Oberbayern-Ost (VII)
 Runners-up: 1999

Recent managers
Recent managers of the club:

Recent seasons
The recent season-by-season performance of the club:

With the introduction of the Bezirksoberligas in 1988 as the new fifth tier, below the Landesligas, all leagues below dropped one tier. With the introduction of the Regionalligas in 1994 and the 3. Liga in 2008 as the new third tier, below the 2. Bundesliga, all leagues below dropped one tier. With the establishment of the Regionalliga Bayern as the new fourth tier in Bavaria in 2012 the Bayernliga was split into a northern and a southern division, the number of Landesligas expanded from three to five and the Bezirksoberligas abolished. All leagues from the Bezirksligas onwards were elevated one tier.

Key

References

External links 
 Official team website (football)  
 Official team website (general)  
 Das deutsche Fußball-Archiv  historical German domestic league tables 
 Manfreds Fussball Archiv  Tables and results from the Bavarian amateur leagues
 SV Wacker Burghausen II at Weltfussball.de  

Reserves
Bavarian reserve football teams
Association football clubs established in 1930
Association football clubs disestablished in 2014
Football in Upper Bavaria
German reserve football teams
Defunct football clubs in Bavaria